The Green Bay Packers are a professional American football franchise based in Green Bay, Wisconsin.  They are currently members of the North Division of the National Football Conference (NFC) in the National Football League (NFL), and are the third-oldest franchise in the NFL.  Founded in 1919 by coach, player, and future Hall of Fame inductee Curly Lambeau and sports and telegraph editor George Whitney Calhoun, the Packers organization has become one of the most successful professional football teams, having won a total of 12 professional American football championships—nine NFL Championships and three Super Bowls—the most in the NFL.  The franchise has recorded 18 NFL divisional titles, eight NFL conference championships, and the second most regular season and overall victories of any NFL franchise, behind the Chicago Bears.

From the inaugural season in 1919 to the completion of the 2019 NFL season, 1493 NFL players have played at least one regular season or playoff game for the Green Bay Packers.  26 of these individuals have been inducted into the Pro Football Hall of Fame, while 109 have been inducted into the Green Bay Packers Hall of Fame (22 players have been inducted into both).

Key 

T-tackle

Players

A
{| class="wikitable sortable" style="text-align: center;" width = 68%;
|-
!width=15%|Player name
!width=7%|Position
!width=20%|College
!width=15%|Seasons
!width=6%|Games
|-
|style="text-align:left;"|
|WR
|style="text-align:left;"|Wisconsin
|2015–16
|14
|-
|style="text-align:left;"|
|B
|style="text-align:left;"|No College
|1946
|10
|-
|style="text-align:left;"|
|E
|style="text-align:left;"|No College
|1921
|1
|-
|style="text-align:left;"|
|G/T
|style="text-align:left;"|Minnesota
|1924-25
|10
|-
|style="text-align:left;"|
|LB
|style="text-align:left;"|Illinois
|1974–76
|40
|-
|style="text-align:left;"|
|T
|style="text-align:left;"|Ohio State
|1943
|10
|-
|style="text-align:left;"|
|WR
|style="text-align:left;"|Fresno State
|2014–21
|
|-
|style="text-align:left;"|
|DT
|style="text-align:left;"|Auburn
|2017–20
|
|-
|style="text-align:left;"|
|CB
|style="text-align:left;"|Michigan State
|1961–69
|125
|-
|style="text-align:left;"|
|B
|style="text-align:left;"|Marshall
|1940–41, 45
|20
|-
|style="text-align:left;"|
|WR
|style="text-align:left;"|Southern California
|1991
|4
|-
|style="text-align:left;"|
|G
|style="text-align:left;"|Nevada-Reno
|1951–54
|48
|-
|style="text-align:left;"|
|K
|style="text-align:left;"|New Mexico
|1961
|3
|-
|style="text-align:left;"|
|P
|style="text-align:left;"|Utah State
|1999
|15
|-
|style="text-align:left;"|
|LB
|style="text-align:left;"|Washington
|2013
|3
|-
|style="text-align:left;"|
|S
|style="text-align:left;"|Arkansas-Pine Bluff
|2000–01
|13
|-
|style="text-align:left;"|
|TE
|style="text-align:left;"|Black Hills State
|2006
|6
|-
|style="text-align:left;"|
|B
|style="text-align:left;"|Oklahoma
|1953
|8
|-
|style="text-align:left;"|
|DE
|style="text-align:left;"|Utah State 
|1963–71
|123
|-
|style="text-align:left;"|
|CB
|style="text-align:left;"|Louisville
|2018–present
|
|-
|style="text-align:left;"|
|DT
|style="text-align:left;"|Louisiana State
|2006
|2
|-
|style="text-align:left;"|
|LB
|style="text-align:left;"|Penn State
|1980–81
|29
|-
|style="text-align:left;"|
|WR
|style="text-align:left;"|Illinois
|2016–19
| 46
|-
|style="text-align:left;"|
|FS
|style="text-align:left;"|Penn State
|2019–present
|
|-
|style="text-align:left;"|
|DE
|style="text-align:left;"|Evansville
|1970
|9
|-
|style="text-align:left;"|
|G
|style="text-align:left;"|Wisconsin
|1957
|12
|-
|style="text-align:left;"|
|LB
|style="text-align:left;"|Millikin
|1987
|3
|-
|style="text-align:left;"|
|TE
|style="text-align:left;"|Tennessee
|1965–66
|24
|-
|style="text-align:left;"|
|RB
|style="text-align:left;"|Texas Tech
|1966–71
|84
|-
|style="text-align:left;"|
|LB
|style="text-align:left;"|Michigan
|1978–89
|146
|-
|style="text-align:left;"|
|S
|style="text-align:left;"|California-Los Angeles
|2002–03
|30
|-
|style="text-align:left;"|
|FB
|style="text-align:left;"|Oklahoma
|1980
|7
|-
|style="text-align:left;"|
|G
|style="text-align:left;"|Southern Connecticut State
|1998–99
|23
|-
|style="text-align:left;"|
|C
|style="text-align:left;"|Michigan State
|1981
|15
|-
|style="text-align:left;"|
|B
|style="text-align:left;"|Southern California
|1932
|2
|-
|style="text-align:left;"|
|DE
|style="text-align:left;"|Stanford
|1990–92
|36
|-
|style="text-align:left;"|
|G/T
|style="text-align:left;"|Wake Forest
|1989–91
|35
|-
|style="text-align:left;"|
|T
|style="text-align:left;"|San Diego State
|1989
|1
|-
|style="text-align:left;"|
|WR
|style="text-align:left;"|Fresno State
|1999
|1
|-
|style="text-align:left;"|
|C
|style="text-align:left;"|Texas A&M
|1995–96
|16
|-
|style="text-align:left;"|
|S
|style="text-align:left;"|Baylor
|1999
|5
|-
|style="text-align:left;"|
|T
|style="text-align:left;"|Gonzaga
|1928–29
|21
|-
|style="text-align:left;"|
|TE
|style="text-align:left;"|Texas Southern
|1975–77
|42
|-
|style="text-align:left;"|
|RB
|style="text-align:left;"|Maryland
|1979–81
|19
|-
|style="text-align:left;"|
|LB
|style="text-align:left;"|Western Illinois
|1987
|3
|-
|style="text-align:left;"|
|WR
|style="text-align:left;"|West Virginia
|2020
|
|-
|style="text-align:left;"|
|DB
|style="text-align:left;"|Prairie View A&M
|1973
|9
|-
|style="text-align:left;"|
|FB
|style="text-align:left;"|Northern Michigan
|1991
|1
|-
|style="text-align:left;"|
|G
|style="text-align:left;"|Alabama
|1980
|9
|-
|}

B

{| class="wikitable sortable" style="text-align: center;" width = 68%;
|-
!width=15%|Player name
!width=7%|Position
!width=20%|College
!width=15%|Seasons
!width=6%|Games
|-
|style="text-align:left;"|
|G
|style="text-align:left;"|West Virginia
|2012–16
| 62
|-
|style="text-align:left;"|
|LB
|style="text-align:left;"|South Florida
|2013–15
|22
|-
|style="text-align:left;"|
|HB
|style="text-align:left;"|Washington State
|1953
|10
|-
|style="text-align:left;"|
|WR
|style="text-align:left;"|Auburn
|2002–03
|8
|-
|style="text-align:left;"|
|T
|style="text-align:left;"|Southern California
|1975
|14
|-
|style="text-align:left;"|
|E
|style="text-align:left;"|Northwestern
|1931
|2
|-
|style="text-align:left;"|
|B
|style="text-align:left;"|Southern Colifornia
|1928–29
|13
|-
|style="text-align:left;"|
|B
|style="text-align:left;"|Iowa
|1939–41
|13
|-
|style="text-align:left;"|
|E
|style="text-align:left;"|Arkansas
|1950
|12
|-
|style="text-align:left;"|
|B
|style="text-align:left;"|Manchester
|1937
|7
|-
|style="text-align:left;"|
|SS
|style="text-align:left;"|Southern Methodist
|2013–16
|8
|-
|style="text-align:left;"|
|DE
|style="text-align:left;"|Grambling State
|1976–79
|60
|-
|style="text-align:left;"|
|G
|style="text-align:left;"|Missouri Southern State
|2007
|7
|-
|style="text-align:left;"|
|P
|style="text-align:left;"|Santa Clara 
|2004
|16
|-
|style="text-align:left;"|
|DE
|style="text-align:left;"|North Carolina
|1999
|1
|-
|style="text-align:left;"|
|DE
|style="text-align:left;"|Oregon
|1956
|2
|-
|style="text-align:left;"|
|E
|style="text-align:left;"|Clemson
|1962
|13
|-
|style="text-align:left;"|
|LB
|style="text-align:left;"|UCLA
|2020
|
|-
|style="text-align:left;"|
|LB
|style="text-align:left;"|Oregon State
|2003–10
|78
|-
|style="text-align:left;"|
|T
|style="text-align:left;"|Baylor
|1945–46
|5
|-
|style="text-align:left;"|
|C
|style="text-align:left;"|Southern California
|1931–32, 34–35
|41
|-
|style="text-align:left;"|
|E
|style="text-align:left;"|Fresno State
|1963
|3
|-
|style="text-align:left;"|
|DE
|style="text-align:left;"|Liberty
|1992
|3
|-
|style="text-align:left;"|
|G
|style="text-align:left;"|Southern California
|1954, 57
|24
|-
|style="text-align:left;"|
|T
|style="text-align:left;"|Arizona
|2002–05
|59
|-
|style="text-align:left;"|
|B
|style="text-align:left;"|Notre Dame
|1921
|8
|-
|style="text-align:left;"|
|B
|style="text-align:left;"|Texas
|1953
|5
|-
|style="text-align:left;"|
|TE
|style="text-align:left;"|Marshall
|1995
|4
|-
|style="text-align:left;"|
|DT
|style="text-align:left;"|Indiana
|1978–79
|21
|-
|style="text-align:left;"|
|B
|style="text-align:left;"|Lawrence 
|1923–27
|41
|-
|style="text-align:left;"|
|DE
|style="text-align:left;"|California-Riverside
|1974
|1
|-
|style="text-align:left;"|
|C
|style="text-align:left;"|Southern Methodist 
|1948
|11
|-
|style="text-align:left;"|
|WR
|style="text-align:left;"|Colorado State
|1992
|16
|-
|style="text-align:left;"|
|DT
|style="text-align:left;"|Texas A&M
|1959–60
|24
|-
|style="text-align:left;"|
|E
|style="text-align:left;"|Marquette 
|1936–38
|30
|-
|style="text-align:left;"|
|T
|style="text-align:left;"|Colorado
|2004
|4
|-
|style="text-align:left;"|
|WR
|style="text-align:left;"|Chadron State
|1996–97
|26
|-
|style="text-align:left;"|
|LB
|style="text-align:left;"|Oregon
|1980
|15
|-
|style="text-align:left;"|
|WR
|style="text-align:left;"|Alabama
|1988
|5
|-
|style="text-align:left;"|
|G
|style="text-align:left;"|New Mexico
|2018
| 12
|-
|style="text-align:left;"|
|G/T
|style="text-align:left;"|Cincinnati
|2000
|6
|-
|style="text-align:left;"|
|G/T
|style="text-align:left;"|Indiana
|1947–49
|35
|-
|style="text-align:left;"|
|RB
|style="text-align:left;"|UCLA
|2013
|3
|-
|style="text-align:left;"|
|CB
|style="text-align:left;"|North Alabama
|1999
|1
|-
|style="text-align:left;"|
|G
|style="text-align:left;"|Hardin–Simmons
|1946
|3
|-
|style="text-align:left;"|
|RB
|style="text-align:left;"|Florida State
|1992–96
|80
|-
|style="text-align:left;"|
|TE
|style="text-align:left;"|Texas A&M
|2017
| 7
|-
|style="text-align:left;"|
|LB
|style="text-align:left;"|Mississippi
|1990–93
|56
|-
|style="text-align:left;"|
|T
|style="text-align:left;"|Fordham
|1942–44
|31
|-
|style="text-align:left;"|
|E
|style="text-align:left;"|Villanova
|1952
|1
|-
|style="text-align:left;"|
|E
|style="text-align:left;"|North Carolina State
|1940
|1
|-
|style="text-align:left;"|
|DB
|style="text-align:left;"|Utah State
|1986
|16
|-
|style="text-align:left;"|
|S
|style="text-align:left;"|Ohio State
|2000
|4
|-
|style="text-align:left;"|
|C
|style="text-align:left;"|St. Mary's (California)
|1933
|2
|-
|style="text-align:left;"|
|LB
|style="text-align:left;"|Purdue
|1955–61
|84
|-
|style="text-align:left;"|
|P
|style="text-align:left;"|Auburn
|1975–80
|86
|-
|style="text-align:left;"|
|P
|style="text-align:left;"|University of Oregon
|2000–03
|64
|-
|style="text-align:left;"|
|G
|style="text-align:left;"|Wisconsin
|1926
|1
|-
|style="text-align:left;"|
|LB
|style="text-align:left;"|Wisconsin
|2017
|9
|-
|style="text-align:left;"|
|S
|style="text-align:left;"|Central Florida
|2005–07
|22
|-
|style="text-align:left;"|
|B
|style="text-align:left;"|Marquette
|1944
|3
|-
|style="text-align:left;"|
|CB
|style="text-align:left;"|North Alabama
|1992
|5
|-
|style="text-align:left;"|
|G
|style="text-align:left;"|Lake Forest
|1939
|1
|-
|style="text-align:left;"|
|K
|style="text-align:left;"|Michigan State
|1979–80
|13
|-
|style="text-align:left;"|
|LB
|style="text-align:left;"|California
|2007–11
|10
|-
|style="text-align:left;"|
|CB
|style="text-align:left;"|Morris Brown
|1998
|3
|-
|style="text-align:left;"|
|CB
|style="text-align:left;"|Boston College
|2006–09
|13
|-
|style="text-align:left;"|
|G
|style="text-align:left;"|Northeast Louisiana
|2002
|1
|-
|style="text-align:left;"|
|G
|style="text-align:left;"|Missouri
|1962
|14
|-
|style="text-align:left;"|
|RB
|style="text-align:left;"|Ball State
|1998
|11
|-
|style="text-align:left;"|
|WR
|style="text-align:left;"|Virginia Union
|1989–90
|30
|-
|style="text-align:left;"|
|B
|style="text-align:left;"|Nebraska
|1930
|3
|-
|style="text-align:left;"|
|WR
|style="text-align:left;"|Portland State
|2006–07
|9
|-
|style="text-align:left;"|
|B
|style="text-align:left;"|Kalamazoo
|1950
|9
|-
|style="text-align:left;"|
|LB
|style="text-align:left;"|Illinois
|1952
|1
|-
|style="text-align:left;"|
|CB
|style="text-align:left;"|Mississippi Delta
|1998
|3
|-
|style="text-align:left;"|
|DT
|style="text-align:left;"|Maryland
|2007
|1
|-
|style="text-align:left;"|
|WR
|style="text-align:left;"|Auburn
|1988
|4
|-
|style="text-align:left;"|
|DE
|style="text-align:left;"|Texas Southern
|1987
|1
|-
|style="text-align:left;"|
|QB
|style="text-align:left;"|California-Los Angeles
|1997
|2
|-
|style="text-align:left;"|
|DE/DT
|style="text-align:left;"|Cincinnati
|1998–99
|30
|-
|style="text-align:left;"|
|DB
|style="text-align:left;"|Austin
|1955–56
|19
|-
|style="text-align:left;"|
|B
|style="text-align:left;"|Tulsa
|1953
|8
|-
|style="text-align:left;"|
|E
|style="text-align:left;"|Creighton
|1938
|1
|-
|style="text-align:left;"|
|DE
|style="text-align:left;"|Indiana
|1955–59
|57
|-
|style="text-align:left;"|
|K
|style="text-align:left;"|Pacific
|1995
|2
|-
|style="text-align:left;"|
|G
|style="text-align:left;"|Alabama
|1928–31
|45
|-
|style="text-align:left;"|
|S
|style="text-align:left;"|Iowa
|2001–02
|21
|-
|style="text-align:left;"|
|DE
|style="text-align:left;"|Western Illinois
|2000
|14
|-
|style="text-align:left;"|
|C
|style="text-align:left;"|Wisconsin
|1964–73
|123
|-
|style="text-align:left;"|
|NT
|style="text-align:left;"|Pittsburgh
|1986–89
|29
|-
|style="text-align:left;"|
|WR
|style="text-align:left;"|Eastern Kentucky
|1978
|2
|-
|style="text-align:left;"|
|DE
|style="text-align:left;"|San Diego State
|1983
|12
|-
|style="text-align:left;"|
|WR
|style="text-align:left;"|Virginia Tech
|2012–14
|39
|-
|style="text-align:left;"|
|P
|style="text-align:left;"|Michigan
|1985–90
|80
|-
|style="text-align:left;"|
|QB
|style="text-align:left;"|Prairie View A&M
|1955
|7
|-
|style="text-align:left;"|
|WR
|style="text-align:left;"|Jackson State
|1998–2001
|42
|-
|style="text-align:left;"|
|G
|style="text-align:left;"|Michigan
|2020
|
|-
|style="text-align:left;"|
|G
|style="text-align:left;"|Penn State
|1969–71
|15
|-
|style="text-align:left;"|
|LS
|style="text-align:left;"|Mississippi State
|2018–21
|
|-
|style="text-align:left;"|
|LB
|style="text-align:left;"|Kentucky
|1992
|8
|-
|style="text-align:left;"|
|DE
|style="text-align:left;"|Alabama
|1981–83
|41
|-
|style="text-align:left;"|
|T
|style="text-align:left;"|Houston
|1973
|9
|-
|style="text-align:left;"|
|QB
|style="text-align:left;"|Georgia
|1963–68, 71
|43
|-
|style="text-align:left;"|
|G
|style="text-align:left;"|Western Michigan
|1952
|12
|-
|style="text-align:left;"|
|LB
|style="text-align:left;"|Virginia Tech
|1964
|6
|-
|style="text-align:left;"|
|G
|style="text-align:left;"|Michigan
|1939
|2
|-
|style="text-align:left;"|
|CB
|style="text-align:left;"|Louisiana Tech
|2016–18
|36
|-
|style="text-align:left;"|
|C/LB
|style="text-align:left;"|Nebraska
|1939–47
|92
|-
|style="text-align:left;"|
|B
|style="text-align:left;"|Purdue
|1940–45
|58
|-
|style="text-align:left;"|
|DE/DT
|style="text-align:left;"|Oregon
|1989–94
|76
|-
|style="text-align:left;"|
|RB
|style="text-align:left;"|Ohio State
|1971–77
|85
|-
|style="text-align:left;"|
|T
|style="text-align:left;"|Kansas State
|2002
|2
|-
|style="text-align:left;"|
|CB
|style="text-align:left;"|North Carolina
|1996–97
|5
|-
|style="text-align:left;"|
|WR
|style="text-align:left;"|South Carolina
|1992–98
|96
|-
|style="text-align:left;"|
|B
|style="text-align:left;"|Gonzaga
|1927
|2
|-
|style="text-align:left;"|
|P
|style="text-align:left;"|Southern Mississippi
|1975
|4
|-
|style="text-align:left;"|
|DE
|style="text-align:left;"|Minnesota
|1973–74
|10
|-
|style="text-align:left;"|
|TE
|style="text-align:left;"|Mississippi
|1966–67
|19
|-
|style="text-align:left;"|
|DT
|style="text-align:left;"|Arkansas AM&N
|1966–73
|104
|-
|style="text-align:left;"|
|G
|style="text-align:left;"|Arkansas
|1953–56
|47
|-
|style="text-align:left;"|
|QB
|style="text-align:left;"|Pacific
|1975–76
|26
|-
|style="text-align:left;"|
|CB
|style="text-align:left;"|Michigan
|1987–89
|44
|-
|style="text-align:left;"|
|DE
|style="text-align:left;"|Ole Miss
|2018
| 4
|-
|style="text-align:left;"|
|T
|style="text-align:left;"|Georgia Tech
|1994–96
|25
|-
|style="text-align:left;"|
|DT
|style="text-align:left;"|Kansas
|1993–99, 2001–03
|125
|-
|style="text-align:left;"|
|DE
|style="text-align:left;"|Tennessee
|1998
|4
|-
|style="text-align:left;"|
|C
|style="text-align:left;"|New Mexico
|1980
|7
|-
|style="text-align:left;"|
|LB/DE
|style="text-align:left;"|Virginia Tech
|1982–92
|164
|-
|style="text-align:left;"|
|HB
|style="text-align:left;"|Ball State
|1959
|1
|-
|style="text-align:left;"|
|DB
|style="text-align:left;"|Maryland
|1964–68
|70
|-
|style="text-align:left;"|
|DB
|style="text-align:left;"|Alabama
|2018
|20
|-
|style="text-align:left;"|
|DE/NT
|style="text-align:left;"|Notre Dame
|1987
|11
|-
|style="text-align:left;"|
|B
|style="text-align:left;"|Northwestern
|1931–39
|98
|-
|style="text-align:left;"|
|QB
|style="text-align:left;"|Washington
|1994
|2
|-
|style="text-align:left;"|
|G
|style="text-align:left;"|Indiana
|1941, 44–45
|14
|-
|style="text-align:left;"|
|CB
|style="text-align:left;"|San Diego State
|1972–78
|80
|-
|style="text-align:left;"|
|T
|style="text-align:left;"|Wisconsin
|1921–25
|49
|-
|style="text-align:left;"|
|CB
|style="text-align:left;"|Florida State
|1992–94
|46
|-
|style="text-align:left;"|
|B
|style="text-align:left;"|Minnesota
|1939–41
|21
|-
|style="text-align:left;"|
|T
|style="text-align:left;"|No College
|1924
|1
|-
|style="text-align:left;"|
|G
|style="text-align:left;"|Michigan State
|1955, 58
|20
|-
|style="text-align:left;"|
|C
|style="text-align:left;"|Marquette
|1932–34
|37
|-
|style="text-align:left;"|
|DB
|style="text-align:left;"|Wake Forest
|1985
|7
|-
|style="text-align:left;"|
|SS
|style="text-align:left;"|Georgia Tech
|2010–17
|102
|-
|style="text-align:left;"|
|LB
|style="text-align:left;"|Houston
|1991
|3
|-
|style="text-align:left;"|
|G
|style="text-align:left;"|Oklahoma
|1949–51
|29
|-
|style="text-align:left;"|
|K
|style="text-align:left;"|Central Arkansas
|1988
|1
|-
|style="text-align:left;"|
|DB
|style="text-align:left;"|Nebraska
|1976
|3
|-
|style="text-align:left;"|
|C
|style="text-align:left;"|Washington
|1989–91
|48
|-
|style="text-align:left;"|
|CB
|style="text-align:left;"|Utah State
|2006–14
|137
|-
|style="text-align:left;"|
|B
|style="text-align:left;"|Chattanooga
|1959
|11
|-
|style="text-align:left;"|
|C/T
|style="text-align:left;"|Michigan State
|1934–36, 38
|26
|-
|style="text-align:left;"|
|CB/S
|style="text-align:left;"|Florida State
|1990–2001
|181
|-
|style="text-align:left;"|
|DE
|style="text-align:left;"|Kansas
|1977–82, 85
|95
|-
|style="text-align:left;"|
|TE
|style="text-align:left;"|Marshall
|2017
|1
|-
|}

C

{| class="wikitable sortable" style="text-align: center;" width = 68%;
|-
!width=15%|Player name
!width=7%|Position
!width=20%|College
!width=15%|Seasons
!width=6%|Games
|-
|style="text-align:left;"|
|LB
|style="text-align:left;"|Colorado
|1980
|7
|-
|style="text-align:left;"|
|DB
|style="text-align:left;"|Texas
|1985–86
|30
|-
|style="text-align:left;"|
|LB
|style="text-align:left;"|Texas A&M
|1964–69
|83
|-
|style="text-align:left;"|
|T
|style="text-align:left;"|Gonzaga
|1926–29
|31
|-
|style="text-align:left;"|
|NT
|style="text-align:left;"|Texas Christian
|1987
|3
|-
|style="text-align:left;"|
|QB
|style="text-align:left;"|Wesley
|2017
|1
|-
|style="text-align:left;"|
|LB
|style="text-align:left;"|Minnesota
|2021
|
|-
|style="text-align:left;"|
|QB
|style="text-align:left;"|California
|1981–84
|7
|-
|style="text-align:left;"|
|C
|style="text-align:left;"|Tulane
|1989–93
|61
|-
|style="text-align:left;"|
|B
|style="text-align:left;"|Gonzaga
|1941–44, 46–52
|116
|-
|style="text-align:left;"|
|B
|style="text-align:left;"|Boston College
|1950
|1
|-
|style="text-align:left;"|
|C
|style="text-align:left;"|Texas-Arlington
|1984–89
|68
|-
|style="text-align:left;"|
|TE/LB
|style="text-align:left;"|Boston College
|1967
|2
|-
|style="text-align:left;"|
|B
|style="text-align:left;"|Cincinnati
|1955–56
|9
|-
|style="text-align:left;"|
|G
|style="text-align:left;"|Illinois Tech
|1921
|6
|-
|style="text-align:left;"|
|G
|style="text-align:left;"|Detroit Mercy
|1926
|4
|-
|style="text-align:left;"|
|HB
|style="text-align:left;"|Southern California
|1953–58
|68
|-
|style="text-align:left;"|
|B
|style="text-align:left;"|Arkansas
|1959–63
|66
|-
|style="text-align:left;"|
|LB
|style="text-align:left;"|Texas-El Paso
|1968–77
|140
|-
|style="text-align:left;"|
|DE
|style="text-align:left;"|Florida State
|1984–88
|72
|-
|style="text-align:left;"|
|CB
|style="text-align:left;"|Arkansas
|2004–06
|34
|-
|style="text-align:left;"|
|DE
|style="text-align:left;"|San Diego State
|1968
|6
|-
|style="text-align:left;"|
|RB
|style="text-align:left;"|Alabama
|1986–88
|43
|-
|style="text-align:left;"|
|CB
|style="text-align:left;"|Texas Tech
|1992
|7
|-
|style="text-align:left;"|
|LB
|style="text-align:left;"|Minnesota
|1970–75, 77–78
|106
|-
|style="text-align:left;"|
|E
|style="text-align:left;"|Southern Methodist
|1942
|11
|-
|style="text-align:left;"|
|WR
|style="text-align:left;"|Sacramento State
|1970
|2
|-
|style="text-align:left;"|
|FB
|style="text-align:left;"|Minnesota
|2002
|12
|-
|style="text-align:left;"|
|B
|style="text-align:left;"|Texas Christian
|1934
|1
|-
|style="text-align:left;"|
|WR
|style="text-align:left;"|Utah State
|1979–81, 83–84
|60
|-
|style="text-align:left;"|
|S
|style="text-align:left;"|Arizona
|1988–92
|66
|-
|style="text-align:left;"|
|K
|style="text-align:left;"|Florida
|1965–67
|42
|-
|style="text-align:left;"|
|WR/KR
|style="text-align:left;"|Cincinnati
|2003–05
|48
|-
|style="text-align:left;"|
|T
|style="text-align:left;"|Texas A&M
|1991
|12
|-
|style="text-align:left;"|
|C
|style="text-align:left;"|Middle Tennessee State
|1986–87
|28
|-
|style="text-align:left;"|
|LB
|style="text-align:left;"|Wyoming
|1978
|1
|-
|style="text-align:left;"|
|TE
|style="text-align:left;"|Kansas State
|1984
|3
|-
|style="text-align:left;"|
|LB
|style="text-align:left;"|UCLA
|2008–2010
|46
|-
|style="text-align:left;"|
|TE
|style="text-align:left;"|Boston College
|1993–99
|89
|-
|style="text-align:left;"|
|LB
|style="text-align:left;"|Southern Methodist
|1987
|2
|-
|style="text-align:left;"|
|QB
|style="text-align:left;"|Missouri
|1950
|11
|-
|style="text-align:left;"|
|T
|style="text-align:left;"|Notre Dame
|1953
|12
|-
|style="text-align:left;"|
|B
|style="text-align:left;"|Tennessee
|1949
|9
|-
|style="text-align:left;"|
|WR
|style="text-align:left;"|Michigan
|1970
|14
|-
|style="text-align:left;"|
|DB
|style="text-align:left;"|Auburn
|1985
|3
|-
|style="text-align:left;"|
|QB
|style="text-align:left;"|Nebraska
|1965
|1
|-
|style="text-align:left;"|
|RB
|style="text-align:left;"|Northern Arizona
|1982
|5
|-
|style="text-align:left;"|
|LB
|style="text-align:left;"|Arizona State
|1991
|2
|-
|style="text-align:left;"|
|FB
|style="text-align:left;"|Arkansas
|1983–87
|60
|-
|style="text-align:left;"|
|DT
|style="text-align:left;"|UCLA
|2016–present
|
|-
|style="text-align:left;"|
|WR
|style="text-align:left;"|Marshall
|2017
| 2
|-
|style="text-align:left;"|
|CB
|style="text-align:left;"|Ohio State
|1991–92
|32
|-
|style="text-align:left;"|
|DE
|style="text-align:left;"|Colorado
|1995–97
|15
|-
|style="text-align:left;"|
|WR
|style="text-align:left;"|Louisville
|1993
|16
|-
|style="text-align:left;"|
|FB
|style="text-align:left;"|Georgia
|1955
|2
|-
|style="text-align:left;"|
|B
|style="text-align:left;"|Southern California
|1936
|9
|-
|style="text-align:left;"|
|G
|style="text-align:left;"|St. Mary's (California)
|1947
|9
|-
|style="text-align:left;"|
|T
|style="text-align:left;"|Tennessee
|2000–11
|116
|-
|style="text-align:left;"|
|FS
|style="text-align:left;"|Alabama
|2014–18
| 71
|-
|style="text-align:left;"|
|FB
|style="text-align:left;"|William & Mary
|1950–51
|13
|-
|style="text-align:left;"|
|WR
|style="text-align:left;"|Kentucky
|2011–18, 2021–present
| 105
|-
|style="text-align:left;"|
|RB
|style="text-align:left;"|Tennessee
|1994
|16
|-
|style="text-align:left;"|
|B
|style="text-align:left;"|Purdue
|1947–48
|20
|-
|style="text-align:left;"|
|RB
|style="text-align:left;"|Washington
|1965
|13
|-
|style="text-align:left;"|
|TE
|style="text-align:left;"|Kansas State
|1978–85
|119
|-
|style="text-align:left;"|
|DT
|style="text-align:left;"|Iowa
|2004–07
|41
|-
|style="text-align:left;"|
|LB
|style="text-align:left;"|Mississippi State
|1993
|12
|-
|style="text-align:left;"|
|RB
|style="text-align:left;"|Washington
|2018
| 1
|-
|style="text-align:left;"|
|G/T
|style="text-align:left;"|Boise State
|2006–10
|32
|-
|style="text-align:left;"|
|T
|style="text-align:left;"|Bethune-Cookman
|1987
|10
|-
|style="text-align:left;"|
|HB
|style="text-align:left;"|Louisiana State
|1951
|7
|-
|style="text-align:left;"|
|TE
|style="text-align:left;"|North Alabama
|2001
|4
|-
|style="text-align:left;"|
|LB
|style="text-align:left;"|Washington
|1992–93
|15
|-
|style="text-align:left;"|
|CB
|style="text-align:left;"|Cal State-Fullerton
|1997
|1
|-
|style="text-align:left;"|
|S
|style="text-align:left;"|Bethune-Cookman
|2005–11
| 95
|-
|style="text-align:left;"|
|RB
|style="text-align:left;"|Oklahoma
|1988
|5
|-
|style="text-align:left;"|
|WR
|style="text-align:left;"|Northern Arizona
|1993
|4
|-
|style="text-align:left;"|
|LS
|style="text-align:left;"|Georgia Tech
|2022–present
|
|-
|style="text-align:left;"|
|CB
|style="text-align:left;"|Ohio State
|2003
|8
|-
|style="text-align:left;"|
|B
|style="text-align:left;"|St. Benedict's
|1943–49
|69
|-
|style="text-align:left;"|
|DB
|style="text-align:left;"|Boise State
|1987
|2
|-
|style="text-align:left;"|
|G
|style="text-align:left;"|Georgetown
|1931–33
|40
|-
|style="text-align:left;"|
|QB
|style="text-align:left;"|Boston College
|1974
|14
|-
|style="text-align:left;"|
|FB/K
|style="text-align:left;"|Clemson
|1951–57
|82
|-
|style="text-align:left;"|
|K
|style="text-align:left;"|Texas
|1971
|1
|-
|style="text-align:left;"|
|G
|style="text-align:left;"|Notre Dame
|1921
|2
|-
|style="text-align:left;"|
|RB
|style="text-align:left;"|Oklahoma State
|1987
|11
|-
|style="text-align:left;"|
|E/DB
|style="text-align:left;"|Alabama
|1948–50
|35
|-
|style="text-align:left;"|
|DE
|style="text-align:left;"|Massachusetts
|1975
|5
|-
|style="text-align:left;"|
|S
|style="text-align:left;"|Iowa
|1998
|9
|-
|style="text-align:left;"|
|LB
|style="text-align:left;"|Colorado
|1974
|13
|-
|style="text-align:left;"|
|WR
|style="text-align:left;"|Memphis State
|1998
|3
|-
|style="text-align:left;"|
|LB
|style="text-align:left;"|Oklahoma State
|1988
|2
|-
|style="text-align:left;"|
|T/G
|style="text-align:left;"|North Carolina A&T
|2005–07
|16
|-
|style="text-align:left;"|
|T
|style="text-align:left;"|Notre Dame
|1921
|5
|-
|style="text-align:left;"|
|HB
|style="text-align:left;"|Notre Dame
|1950, 53
|19
|-
|style="text-align:left;"|
|LB
|style="text-align:left;"|Fresno State
|1996
|16
|-
|style="text-align:left;"|
|TE
|style="text-align:left;"|Miami
|2010–12
| 46
|-
|style="text-align:left;"|
|E/B
|style="text-align:left;"|South Carolina
|1939–49
|121
|-
|style="text-align:left;"|
|CB/WR
|style="text-align:left;"|Howard Payne
|1995, 99
|13
|-
|style="text-align:left;"|
|E
|style="text-align:left;"|Auburn
|1948
|3
|-
|style="text-align:left;"|
|DT
|style="text-align:left;"|Tuskegee
|1968
|10
|-
|style="text-align:left;"|
|G/B
|style="text-align:left;"|Notre Dame
|1945
|6
|-
|style="text-align:left;"|
|RB
|style="text-align:left;"|North Dakota State
|2015
|2
|-
|style="text-align:left;"|
|T
|style="text-align:left;"|Ripon
|1942–47
|51
|-
|style="text-align:left;"|
|HB
|style="text-align:left;"|Marquette
|1922
|5
|-
|style="text-align:left;"|
|K
|style="text-align:left;"|Colorado
|2007–present
|
|-
|style="text-align:left;"|
|T
|style="text-align:left;"|Iowa
|1988
|16
|-
|style="text-align:left;"|
|RB
|style="text-align:left;"|Nevada-Las Vegas
|1984
|16
|-
|style="text-align:left;"|
|HB
|style="text-align:left;"|Notre Dame
|1925
|3
|-
|style="text-align:left;"|
|LB
|style="text-align:left;"|Texas Christian
|1964–67, 71–72
|80
|-
|style="text-align:left;"|
|B
|style="text-align:left;"|Marquette
|1947
|10
|-
|style="text-align:left;"|
|FB
|style="text-align:left;"|Oklahoma
|1977–79
|29
|-
|style="text-align:left;"|
|T
|style="text-align:left;"|Notre Dame
|1932
|1
|-
|style="text-align:left;"|
|S
|style="text-align:left;"|Fresno State
|2006
|14
|-
|style="text-align:left;"|
|LB
|style="text-align:left;"|Oklahoma
|1980–85
|80
|-
|style="text-align:left;"|
|LB
|style="text-align:left;"|Temple
|1983
|13
|-
|style="text-align:left;"|
|LB
|style="text-align:left;"|Michigan State
|1958–64
|90
|-
|style="text-align:left;"|
|C
|style="text-align:left;"|Georgia Tech
|1965–66
|28
|-
|style="text-align:left;"|
|T
|style="text-align:left;"|Montana
|1999
|5
|-
|style="text-align:left;"|
|G
|style="text-align:left;"|Northwestern
|1960
|12
|-
|style="text-align:left;"|
|T
|style="text-align:left;"|Gonzaga
|1926
|10
|-
|}

D

{| class="wikitable sortable" style="text-align: center;" width = 68%;
|-
!width=15%|Player name
!width=7%|Position
!width=20%|College
!width=15%|Seasons
!width=6%|Games
|-
|style="text-align:left;"|
|LB
|style="text-align:left;"|Penn State
|1992
|2
|-
|style="text-align:left;"|
|TE
|style="text-align:left;"|Indiana State
|2020–21
|
|-
|style="text-align:left;"|
|T
|style="text-align:left;"|San Diego State
|1955
|12
|-
|style="text-align:left;"|
|WR
|style="text-align:left;"|Virginia Tech
|1965–72
|111
|-
|style="text-align:left;"|
|K
|style="text-align:left;"|Washington State
|1975
|12
|-
|style="text-align:left;"|
|T
|style="text-align:left;"|Pittsburgh
|1937
|5
|-
|style="text-align:left;"|
|LB
|style="text-align:left;"|Auburn
|1957
|12
|-
|style="text-align:left;"|
|RB
|style="text-align:left;"|Minnesota
|1997
|14
|-
|style="text-align:left;"|
|C
|style="text-align:left;"|Beloit
|1927–31
|36
|-
|style="text-align:left;"|
|HB
|style="text-align:left;"|Hardin–Simmons
|1931
|2
|-
|style="text-align:left;"|
|RB/FB
|style="text-align:left;"|Miami (Florida)
|2002–05
|39
|-
|style="text-align:left;"|
|DE/DT
|style="text-align:left;"|Wisconsin
|1991–94
|50
|-
|style="text-align:left;"|
|DE
|style="text-align:left;"|Washington
|1961
|14
|-
|style="text-align:left;"|
|LB
|style="text-align:left;"|Utah
|1999
|14
|-
|style="text-align:left;"|
|WR
|style="text-align:left;"|Tennessee A&l
|1971–72
|24
|-
|style="text-align:left;"|
|B
|style="text-align:left;"|Mississippi State
|1951
|12
|-
|style="text-align:left;"|
|RB
|style="text-align:left;"|Texas Christian
|1986–88
|35
|-
|style="text-align:left;"|
|G
|style="text-align:left;"|Marquette
|1922
|7
|-
|style="text-align:left;"|
|G
|style="text-align:left;"|Wisconsin
|1947–48
|22
|-
|style="text-align:left;"|
|LS
|style="text-align:left;"|Shippensburg
|1997–2007
|167
|-
|style="text-align:left;"|
|S
|style="text-align:left;"|Florida
|2021
|
|-
|style="text-align:left;"|
|TE
|style="text-align:left;"|Georgia Tech
|2021–present
|
|-
|style="text-align:left;"|
|TE
|style="text-align:left;"|Virginia
|1997–2002
|69
|-
|style="text-align:left;"|
|DE
|style="text-align:left;"|Grambling State
|1960–69
|138
|-
|style="text-align:left;"|
|K
|style="text-align:left;"|Eastern Kentucky
|1988
|4
|-
|style="text-align:left;"|
|HB
|style="text-align:left;"|Texas
|1953
|7
|-
|style="text-align:left;"|
|DT
|style="text-align:left;"|Wisconsin
|1971
|9
|-
|style="text-align:left;"|
|NT
|style="text-align:left;"|Rhode Island
|1984
|1
|-
|style="text-align:left;"|
|FB
|style="text-align:left;"|Grambling State
|1991
|9
|-
|style="text-align:left;"|
|T
|style="text-align:left;"|Texas
|1948
|8
|-
|style="text-align:left;"|
|T
|style="text-align:left;"|Southwest Missouri State
|1952
|9
|-
|style="text-align:left;"|
|DE
|style="text-align:left;"|Texas
|1985
|1
|-
|style="text-align:left;"|
|TE
|style="text-align:left;"|Cincinnati
|2020–present
|2
|-
|style="text-align:left;"|
|QB
|style="text-align:left;"|Tampa
|1973
|8
|-
|style="text-align:left;"|
|K
|style="text-align:left;"|Auburn
|1984–87
|46
|-
|style="text-align:left;"|
|C/G
|style="text-align:left;"|Wisconsin
|1996–98
|33
|-
|style="text-align:left;"|
|CB
|style="text-align:left;"|Rice
|2005–06
|16
|-
|style="text-align:left;"|
|WR
|style="text-align:left;"|New Mexico
|1985
|16
|-
|style="text-align:left;"|
|LB
|style="text-align:left;"|Tulane
|1986–92
|95
|-
|style="text-align:left;"|
|P
|style="text-align:left;"|No College
|1955–57
|36
|-
|style="text-align:left;"|
|QB
|style="text-align:left;"|Brigham Young
|1993, 95
|7
|-
|style="text-align:left;"|
|G
|style="text-align:left;"|Ohio State
|1950–51
|18
|-
|style="text-align:left;"|
|QB
|style="text-align:left;"|Kansas State
|1976–77, 79–85
|105
|-
|style="text-align:left;"|
|TE
|style="text-align:left;"|Portland State
|1988–89
|31
|-
|style="text-align:left;"|
|G
|style="text-align:left;"|Idaho State
|2009–13
| 61
|-
|style="text-align:left;"|
|LB
|style="text-align:left;"|Ohio State
|2000–05
|84
|-
|style="text-align:left;"|
|RB
|style="text-align:left;"|Boston College
|2020–present
|
|-
|style="text-align:left;"|
|DB
|style="text-align:left;"|Texas
|1952–59
|94
|-
|style="text-align:left;"|
|QB
|style="text-align:left;"|Duke
|1989–90
|10
|-
|style="text-align:left;"|
|E
|style="text-align:left;"|Marquette
|1927–34
|98
|-
|style="text-align:left;"|
|DT
|style="text-align:left;"|Southern California
|1980
|3
|-
|style="text-align:left;"|
|DT
|style="text-align:left;"|Virginia
|1999
|6
|-
|style="text-align:left;"|
|T
|style="text-align:left;"|Albright
|1940
|5
|-
|style="text-align:left;"|
|G
|style="text-align:left;"|Wisconsin
|1959
|12
|-
|style="text-align:left;"|
|C
|style="text-align:left;"|Drake
|1931
|12
|-
|style="text-align:left;"|
|TE
|style="text-align:left;"|San Francisco
|1973–74
|27
|-
|style="text-align:left;"|
|CB
|style="text-align:left;"|Northern Iowa
|2016
|4
|-
|style="text-align:left;"|
|CB
|style="text-align:left;"|Southern
|1995
|10
|-
|style="text-align:left;"|
|K
|style="text-align:left;"|Toronto
|1988
|3
|-
|style="text-align:left;"|
|LB
|style="text-align:left;"|Connecticut
|1984–88
|76
|-
|style="text-align:left;"|
|T
|style="text-align:left;"|Texas A&I
|1993–2002
|120
|-
|style="text-align:left;"|
|DT
|style="text-align:left;"|Baylor
|1996–2001
|88
|-
|style="text-align:left;"|
|WR
|style="text-align:left;"|Nevada
|2022–present
|
|-
|style="text-align:left;"|
|CB
|style="text-align:left;"|West Virginia
|2021–present
|
|-
|style="text-align:left;"|
|QB
|style="text-align:left;"|Kansas
|1978
|12
|-
|style="text-align:left;"|
|LB
|style="text-align:left;"|San Diego State
|1978–85
|119
|-
|style="text-align:left;"|
|CB
|style="text-align:left;"|Tulane
|1996
|9
|-
|style="text-align:left;"|
|T
|style="text-align:left;"|Baylor
|1952
|12
|-
|style="text-align:left;"|
|WR
|style="text-align:left;"|Colorado
|1959–69
|150
|-
|style="text-align:left;"|
|QB
|style="text-align:left;"|Yale
|1977
|2
|-
|style="text-align:left;"|
|G
|style="text-align:left;"|North Carolina
|1983–84
|32
|-
|style="text-align:left;"|
|B
|style="text-align:left;"|Wisconsin
|1950
|12
|-
|style="text-align:left;"|
|WR
|style="text-align:left;"|Alcorn State
|1999–2012
|129
|-
|style="text-align:left;"|
|DT
|style="text-align:left;"|Iowa
|1987
|2
|-
|style="text-align:left;"|
|G
|style="text-align:left;"|Temple
|1950
|11
|-
|style="text-align:left;"|
|E
|style="text-align:left;"|No College
|1921
|6
|-
|style="text-align:left;"|
|CB
|style="text-align:left;"|Nevada-Reno
|1994
|3
|-
|style="text-align:left;"|
|B
|style="text-align:left;"|Marquette
|1924
|3
|-
|style="text-align:left;"|
|B
|style="text-align:left;"|Florida
|1944
|8
|-
|style="text-align:left;"|
|C
|style="text-align:left;"|Florida State
|1994
|6
|-
|style="text-align:left;"|
|WR
|style="text-align:left;"|Duke
|1968
|2
|-
|style="text-align:left;"|
|P
|style="text-align:left;"|Tulsa
|1971
|2
|-
|style="text-align:left;"|
|B
|style="text-align:left;"|Marquette
|1927–31
|58
|-
|style="text-align:left;"|
|E
|style="text-align:left;"|Minnesota
|1922
|2
|-
|}

See also
List of Green Bay Packers players: E–K
List of Green Bay Packers players: L–R
List of Green Bay Packers players: S–Z

References
General

Specific

A
players